Rat Portage 38A is a First Nations reserve on Lake of the Woods in northwestern Ontario. It is one of two reserves of the Obashkaandagaang Bay First Nation.

References

Ojibwe reserves in Ontario
Communities in Kenora District